Cupaniopsis is a genus of about 67 species of trees and shrubs of the soapberry family, Sapindaceae. They grow naturally in New Guinea, New Caledonia, Australia, Torres Strait Islands, Fiji, Samoa, Sulawesi, Micronesia. Many species have been threatened with extinction globally or nationally, with official recognition by the International Union for Conservation of Nature (IUCN) and several national and state governments.

Tuckeroo is a common name suffix for some species in Australia.

C. anacardioides has been introduced into the United States, where in some parts they are invasive plants, primarily in Florida and Hawaii, where the common name Carrotwood applies.

Conservation

At global, national and government regional scales, many Cupaniopsis species have been threatened with extinction, as officially recognised by the International Union for Conservation of Nature (IUCN), governments of Australia, New Caledonia and so on.

Globally, the New Caledonian endemic species C. crassivalvis has become extinct according to the IUCN's 1998 assessment. Seven species endemic to New Caledonia have become endangered with global extinction according to the IUCN's 1998 assessments. Five species endemic to New Guinea, one endemic to New Caledonia and one endemic to Sulawesi have become vulnerable to global extinction according to the IUCN's 1998 and 2010 assessments.

In Australia, C. shirleyana and C. tomentella, small trees endemic to small areas of southeastern Queensland (Qld), have obtained the "vulnerable" species Australian government's national conservation status and together also with C. cooperorum, the Qld government's "vulnerable" species state conservation status. C. newmannii small trees in eastern Qld have obtained the Qld government's "near threatened" species state conservation status. C. serrata small trees in northeastern New South Wales (NSW) have obtained the NSW government's "endangered" species state conservation status.

Naming and classification

European science formally named and described this genus in 1879 using C. anacardioides for the type species, authored by Bavarian botanist Ludwig A. T. Radlkofer.

In 1991 a 190-page monograph of the whole genus was published by Dutch botanist Frits Adema.

Australian botanist Sally T. Reynolds, from 1984 to 1991 published new formal scientific names, descriptions, updates and species clarifications, in her scientific journal articles and the Flora of Australia treatment.

Species

This listing was sourced from the Australian Plant Name Index and Australian Plant Census, the Australian Tropical Rainforest Plants information system, the Census of Vascular Plants of Papua New Guinea, the Checklist of the vascular indigenous Flora of New Caledonia, Flora Malesiana, Fruits of the Australian Tropical Rainforest, "The Endemic Plants of Micronesia", Plants in Samoan Culture, Flora Vitiensis (Fiji), the 2013 Census of the Queensland Flora, the Flora of New South Wales, and the Flora of Australia.
 Cupaniopsis acuticarpa  – New Guinea –  Vulnerable
 Cupaniopsis amoena  – Fiji endemic
 Cupaniopsis anacardioides , Tuckeroo – NSW, Qld, NT, WA, Australia, New Guinea

 Cupaniopsis apiocarpa  – New Caledonia endemic

 Cupaniopsis azantha  – New Caledonia endemic
 Cupaniopsis baileyana  – NE. NSW, to SE. Qld endemic, Australia
 Cupaniopsis bilocularis  – New Guinea

 Cupaniopsis bullata  – New Guinea –  Vulnerable

 Cupaniopsis celebica  – Sulawesi
 Cupaniopsis chytradenia  – New Caledonia endemic
 Cupaniopsis concolor  – Fiji endemic
 Cupaniopsis cooperorum  – NE. Qld endemic, Australia
 Cupaniopsis crassivalvis  – New Caledonia endemic –  Extinct
 Cupaniopsis curvidens  – New Guinea

 Cupaniopsis dallachyi  – NE. Qld endemic, Australia

 Cupaniopsis diploglottoides  – NE. Qld endemic, Australia

 Cupaniopsis euneura  – New Guinea –  Vulnerable

 Cupaniopsis flagelliformis  – NSW, Qld, Australia
 var. australis  – NE. NSW, to SE. Qld endemic, Australia
 var. flagelliformis – Cape York to NE. Qld endemic, Australia
 Cupaniopsis fleckeri  – Torres Strait Is., Cape York Peninsula, Qld endemic, Australia
 Cupaniopsis foveolata  – Cape York Peninsula, NE to central E. Qld, endemic, Australia
 Cupaniopsis fruticosa  – New Caledonia endemic

 Cupaniopsis glabra  – New Caledonia endemic –  Endangered
 Cupaniopsis globosa  – New Caledonia endemic –  Vulnerable
 Cupaniopsis glomeriflora  – New Caledonia endemic

 Cupaniopsis grandiflora  – New Caledonia endemic
 Cupaniopsis grisea  – New Caledonia endemic

 Cupaniopsis guillauminii  – Chuuk Islands endemic (Micronesia)

 Cupaniopsis hypodermatica  – New Caledonia endemic

 Cupaniopsis inoplea  – New Caledonia endemic

 Cupaniopsis kajewskii  – New Guinea
 Cupaniopsis leptobotrys  – Fiji endemic

 Cupaniopsis mackeeana  – New Caledonia endemic
 Cupaniopsis macrocarpa  – New Caledonia endemic
 var. macrocarpa – New Caledonia endemic
 var. polyphylla – New Caledonia endemic
 Cupaniopsis macropetala  – New Guinea
 Cupaniopsis megalocarpa  – New Caledonia endemic
 Cupaniopsis mouana  – New Caledonia endemic –  Endangered

 Cupaniopsis myrmoctona  – New Caledonia endemic
 Cupaniopsis napaensis  – New Guinea –  Vulnerable

 Cupaniopsis newmanii  – NE. NSW, to SE. Qld endemic, Australia
 Cupaniopsis oedipoda  – New Caledonia endemic

 Cupaniopsis papillosa , syn.: C. sp. (Tully Falls) – NE. Qld endemic, Australia

 Cupaniopsis parvifolia  – NE. NSW, to E. Qld, endemic, Australia

 Cupaniopsis pennelii  – New Caledonia endemic
 Cupaniopsis petiolulata  – New Caledonia endemic
 Cupaniopsis phalacrocarpa  – New Caledonia endemic
 Cupaniopsis phanerophlebia  – New Guinea –  Vulnerable
 Cupaniopsis platycarpa  – New Guinea

 Cupaniopsis rhytidocarpa  – New Guinea
 Cupaniopsis rosea  – New Caledonia endemic –  Endangered
 Cupaniopsis rotundifolia  – New Caledonia endemic –  Endangered
 Cupaniopsis samoensis  – Samoa endemic

 Cupaniopsis serrata  – NE. NSW, to SE. Qld endemic, Australia

 Cupaniopsis shirleyana  – SE. Qld endemic, Australia
 Cupaniopsis simulata  – NE. to SE. Qld, endemic, Australia
 Cupaniopsis squamosa  – New Caledonia endemic –  Endangered
 Cupaniopsis stenopetala  – New Guinea, Moluccas

 Cupaniopsis strigosa  – Sulawesi –  Vulnerable

 Cupaniopsis subfalcata  – New Caledonia endemic –  Endangered

 Cupaniopsis sylvatica  – New Caledonia endemic
 Cupaniopsis tomentella  – SE. Qld endemic, Australia
 Cupaniopsis tontoutensis  – New Caledonia endemic –  Endangered

 Cupaniopsis trigonocarpa  – New Caledonia endemic
 Cupaniopsis vitiensis  – Fiji endemic

 Cupaniopsis wadsworthii  – NE. to E. central Qld, endemic, Australia

Species accepted by the official Census of the Queensland Flora 2013, while awaiting formal naming, description and publication
 Cupaniopsis sp. (Biggenden J.Randall 600) – Biggenden and Childers areas, SE. central Queensland
 Cupaniopsis sp. (Watalgan A.R.Bean 8611) – Gladstone region, E. central Queensland

References

Cited works 

 
 
 
 

 
Flora of New Guinea
Flora of Papua New Guinea
Flora of New South Wales
Flora of Queensland
Flora of New Caledonia
Flora of Malesia
Sapindaceae genera
Sapindales of Australia